Homer Taylor Beatty (August 31, 1915 – March 16, 2000) was an American football player and coach.  He served as the head football coach at California State University, Los Angeles—renamed from Los Angeles State College of Applied Arts and Sciences in 1963—from 1963 to 1965, compiling a record of 25–2. 

Beatty died at the age of 84, on March 16, 2000, at St. Mary's Hospital in Long Beach, California.

Head coaching record

College

References

External links
 

1915 births
2000 deaths
American football halfbacks
Bakersfield Renegades football coaches
Cal State Los Angeles Diablos football coaches
Santa Ana Dons football coaches
USC Trojans football players
High school football coaches in California
People from Kern County, California
Coaches of American football from California
Players of American football from California